Acmaeodera alicia is a species of metallic wood-boring beetle in the family Buprestidae. It is found in Central America, Mexico, and the Southwest United States. Larval hosts include Acacia and Cercidium and adult hosts include Baileya, Ferocactus, Hymenothrix.

References

Further reading

 
 
 

alicia
Articles created by Qbugbot
Beetles described in 1899